2000 Korean FA Cup, known as the 2000 Seoul Bank FA Cup, was the fifth edition of the Korean FA Cup. It was the first competition to give high school teams qualifications, and two high schools participated.

Bracket

First round

Round of 16

Quarter-finals

Semi-finals

Final

Awards

See also
2000 in South Korean football
2000 K League
2000 Korean League Cup
2000 Korean League Cup (Supplementary Cup)

References

External links
Official website
Fixtures & Results at JoinKFA

2000
2000 in South Korean football
2000 domestic association football cups